Secrets of the National Trust is a television programme, anchored by Alan Titchmarsh, which first aired on Tuesday 7 February 2017 on Channel 5 and now airs on 5Select

History
The show is based on Alan Titchmarsh and other well known celebrities and experts visiting National Trust properties and showing viewers stories, restoration work and other interesting facts about National Trust property and lands.

The programme came under scrutiny when, in Series 1 Episode 1, viewers were told that they were visiting Croome Court in Shropshire, when in fact the stately home is located in Worcestershire.

List of episodes
Each week Alan Titchmarsh was based at an anchor location. Each episode usually featured two or three cutaways to other locations with a relevant link, presented by a guest celebrity. The Kingston Lacy and Tyntesfield episodes were finally broadcast on 5Select as part of series 5 on 17 November and 15 December 2020 respectively. They were originally expected to be shown in August 2018.

Series 1:

 Episode 1 - Tuesday 7 February 2017 - anchor location Knole House, Kent - viewed by 1.14m 
 Episode 2 - Tuesday 14 February 2017 - anchor location Hill Top, Cumbria - viewed by 1.07m
 Episode 3 - Tuesday 21 February 2017 - anchor location Attingham Park, Shropshire - viewed by 1.32m
 Episode 4 - Tuesday 1 March 2017 - anchor location Quarry Bank Mill, Cheshire - viewed by 1.19m
 Episode 5 - Tuesday 8 March 2017 - anchor location Lyme Park, Cheshire - viewed by 1.13m
 Episode 6 - Tuesday 15 March 2017 - anchor location Fountains Abbey, Yorkshire - viewed by 1.3m

Series 2:

 Episode 1 - Tuesday 27 February 2018 - anchor location Hardwick Hall, Derbyshire
 Episode 2 - Tuesday 6 March 2018 - anchor location Stowe House, Buckinghamshire
 Episode 3 - Tuesday 13 March 2018 - anchor location Waddesdon Manor, Buckinghamshire
 Episode 4 - Tuesday 20 March 2018 - anchor location The Workhouse, Southwell, Nottinghamshire
 Episode 5 - Tuesday 27 March 2018 - anchor location Cragside, Northumberland
 Episode 6 - Tuesday 3 April 2018 - anchor location Castle Ward, County Down, Northern Ireland

Series 3:

 Episode 1 - Wednesday 27 June 2018 - anchor location Erddig, North Wales
 Episode 2 - Wednesday 4 July 2018 - anchor location Shugborough Hall, Staffordshire
 Episode 3 - Wednesday 11 July 2018 - anchor location Mount Stewart, County Down, Northern Ireland
Episode 4 - Wednesday 18 July 2018 - anchor location Dunham Massey Hall, Cheshire

Series 4:

Episode 1 - Tuesday 23 July 2019 - anchor location Petworth House, West Sussex
Episode 2 - Tuesday 30 July 2019 - anchor location Chartwell, Kent
Episode 3 - Tuesday 6 August 2019 - anchor location Plas Newydd, Anglesey
Series 5:
Episode 1 - Tuesday 17 November 2020 - anchor location Kingston Lacy, Dorset
Episode 2 - Tuesday 24 November 2020 - anchor location Kedleston Hall, Derbyshire
Episode 3 - Tuesday 1 December 2020 - anchor location Ham House, Greater London
Episode 4 - Tuesday 8 December 2020 - anchor location Penrhyn Castle, Gwynedd
Episode 5 - Tuesday 15 December 2020 - anchor location Tyntesfield, Somerset

List of co-hosts
 Anneka Rice
 Jon Culshaw
 Joan Bakewell
 Oz Clarke
 Miriam O'Reilly
 Dan Jones
 Suzannah Lipscomb
 Nigel Havers
 Louis Emerick
 Angellica Bell
 Jennie Bond
 Peter Purves
 Pete Waterman
 Shappi Khorsandi
 Alison Hammond
 Ronnie Archer Morgan
 Tony Singh
 Floella Benjamin
 Nina Wadia
 Clive Aslet
 Angela Rippon
 Lisa Holloway
 Gloria Hunniford

References

2017 British television series debuts
Channel 5 (British TV channel) original programming
English-language television shows